Lee Hyeon-su is a South Korean writer. She was born in Yeongdong, Chungcheongbuk-do in 1959. She graduated from Yeungnam University in textile studies. She began her literary career when her short story “Geu jaenanui jojimeun songarak-eseobuteo sijakdoe-eotda” (그 재난의 조짐은 손가락에서부터 시작되었다 The Sign of Disaster Came From The Finger) won the 1991 Chungcheong Ilbo New Writer's Award. Later, she won the 1997 Munhakdongne Winter Literary Contest with her short story “Mareun naldeul sai-e” (마른 날들 사이에 Between Dry Days) and began to commit to writing full-time. She published story collections Toran (토란 Taro), and “Jangminamu sikgijang” (장미나무 식기장 The Rose Tree Cupboard), as well as novels Singisaengdyeon (신기생뎐 New Tales of Gisaeng), Gilgatjib yeoja (길갓집 여자 The Woman From the House on the Road), and Naheul (나흘 4 Days). She won the Hahn Moo-Sook Literary Prize and the Mu-young Literary Prize.

Writing 
In her commentary for winning the Munhakdongne Winter Literary Contest in 1997, Lee voiced her thoughts on the definition of a novel.

Lee's thoughts on fiction that spoke of a cheating husband was a conservative stance that was both alien, and a challenge. Her work Singisaengdyeon (신기생뎐 New Tales of Gisaeng), which narrates the lives of gisaengs in Gunsan and Naheul (나흘 4 Days), which chases after the hidden history of the No Gun Ri Massacre, can be seen as her literary self-confirmations.

Critic Jang Eunsu, in describing the characters of Singisaengdyeon (신기생뎐 New Tales of Gisaeng) described Lee's fiction: “The high achievements of Lee Hyeon-su’s fiction are at times hidden by the ‘tastes of her sentences’. The author's focused interest due to her unwillingness to leave out even the smallest detail of the lives of her characters, actually becomes an obstacle in entering that character's life and its vivid reality. Our pitiful minds that must adapt to the fast pace and rhythm of civilization, are surprised and startled by the excitement of the sentence that rises within our body like a somewhat familiar monster. (abridged...) As a traditional artist of language, Lee Hyeon-su ties fantastic descriptions and rich dialogue, and tenaciously tells the life journey of the people of the Buyonggak. The gisaeng house culture, now being helplessly forgotten within the tides of modernization, is depicted in a rich miniature. And she carefully records the life of the gisaeng, who has “learned the feeling of pain before even coming of age.” As Jang Eunsu states, Lee Hyeon-su is our generation's “traditional artist of language."

Works

Short Story Collections 
 Toran (토란 Taro), Munidang, 2003.  
 Jangminamu sikgijang (장미나무 식기장 The Rose Tree Cupboard), Munhakdongne, 2009.

Novels 
 Gilgatjib yeoja (길갓집 여자 The Woman From the House on the Road), Iroom, 2000.  
 Singisaengdyeon (신기생뎐 New Tales of Gisaeng), Munhakdongne, 2005.   
 Naheul (나흘 4 Days), Munhakdongne, 2013.

Works in translation 
 Au lotus d'or : Histoires de courtisanes (French)
 СКАЗАНИЕ О НОВЪIХ КИСЭН (Russian)
 Die letzte Gisaeng: Roman (German)

Awards 
 15th Hahn Moo-Sook Literary Prize (2010)
 2nd The Violet People's Literature Award (2007)
 Mu-young Literary Prize (2003)
 2nd Kim Yujung Literature Prize (1996)

Further reading 
 Jang, Gyeongryeol, “In Search of the Meaning Behind the Cultural Manifestation of the No Gun Ri Massacre: Analysing the literature of Jeong Eun-yong, Jayne Anne Phillips, and Lee Hyeon-su”, Dong-A Mun-Hwa 53, Seoul National University Institute for Asian Studies, 2015.  
 Go, Myeongcheol, “The Sound and Dance That Withstands the Fate of Extinction: Lee Hyeon-su’s Novel, “Singisaengdyeon” (신기생뎐 New Tales of Gisaeng)”, The Blossom of Bone Flowers, Kephoi Books, 2009.  
 Lee, Gyeong, “The Picture Puzzle of Cooking and Sexuality: Lee Hyeon-su’s “Toran” (토란 Taro) 
 ”, Literary Criticism Today 52, 2004.  
 Lee, Hyeon-su, “The Motive if Creation: The Underlying Conditions of Fiction Writing”, Writer's World, Spring 2006. 
 Munjang, 2015.

References 

Living people
South Korean writers
Year of birth missing (living people)